Brighton is a community in the Canadian province of Nova Scotia, located in The Municipality of the District of Digby. in Digby County.

References
 Brighton on Destination Nova Scotia

Communities in Digby County, Nova Scotia
General Service Areas in Nova Scotia